The Marchantiophyta are a division of non-vascular land plants commonly referred to as hepatics or liverworts. Like mosses and hornworts, they have a gametophyte-dominant life cycle, in which cells of the plant carry only a single set of genetic information.

It is estimated that there are about 9000 species of liverworts. Some of the more familiar species grow as a flattened leafless thallus, but most species are leafy with a form very much like a flattened moss. Leafy species can be distinguished from the apparently similar mosses on the basis of a number of features, including their single-celled rhizoids. Leafy liverworts also differ from most (but not all) mosses in that their leaves never have a costa (present in many mosses) and may bear marginal cilia (very rare in mosses). Other differences are not universal for all mosses and liverworts, but the occurrence of leaves arranged in three ranks, the presence of deep lobes or segmented leaves, or a lack of clearly differentiated stem and leaves all point to the plant being a liverwort. Liverworts are distinguished from mosses in having unique complex oil bodies of high refractive index.

Liverworts are typically small, usually from 2–20 mm wide with individual plants less than 10 cm long, and are therefore often overlooked.  However, certain species may cover large patches of ground, rocks, trees or any other reasonably firm substrate on which they occur. They are distributed globally in almost every available habitat, most often in humid locations although there are desert and Arctic species as well. Some species can be a nuisance in shady greenhouses or a weed in gardens.

Physical characteristics

Description 

The most familiar liverworts consist of a prostrate, flattened, ribbon-like or branching structure called a thallus (plant body); these liverworts are termed thallose liverworts. However, most liverworts produce flattened stems with overlapping scales or leaves in two or more ranks, the middle rank is often conspicuously different from the outer ranks; these are called leafy liverworts or scale liverworts. (See the gallery below for examples.)

Liverworts can most reliably be distinguished from the apparently similar mosses by their single-celled rhizoids.  Other differences are not universal for all mosses and all liverworts; but the lack of clearly differentiated stem and leaves in thallose species, or in leafy species the presence of deeply lobed or segmented leaves and the presence of leaves arranged in three ranks, as well as frequent dichotomous branching, all point to the plant being a liverwort. Unlike any other embryophytes, most liverworts contain unique membrane-bound oil bodies containing isoprenoids in at least some of their cells, lipid droplets in the cytoplasm of all other plants being unenclosed. The overall physical similarity of some mosses and leafy liverworts means that confirmation of the identification of some groups can be performed with certainty only with the aid of microscopy or an experienced bryologist.

Liverworts, like other bryophytes, have a gametophyte-dominant life cycle, with the sporophyte dependent on the gametophyte. The sporophyte of many liverworts are non-photosynthetic, but there are also several that are photosynthetic to various degrees. Cells in a typical liverwort plant each contain only a single set of genetic information, so the plant's cells are haploid for the majority of its life cycle. This contrasts sharply with the pattern exhibited by nearly all animals and by vascular plants.   In the more familiar seed plants, the haploid generation is represented only by the tiny pollen and the ovule, while the diploid generation is the familiar tree or other plant.  Another unusual feature of the liverwort life cycle is that sporophytes (i.e. the diploid body) are very short-lived, withering away not long after releasing spores. In mosses, the sporophyte is more persistent and in hornworts, the sporophyte disperses spores over an extended period.

Life cycle 

The life of a liverwort starts from the germination of a haploid spore to produce a protonema, which is either a mass of thread-like filaments or a flattened thallus. The protonema is a transitory stage in the life of a liverwort, from which will grow the mature gametophore ("gamete-bearer") plant that produces the sex organs. The male organs are known as antheridia (singular: antheridium) and produce the sperm cells.  Clusters of antheridia are enclosed by a protective layer of cells called the perigonium (plural: perigonia).  As in other land plants, the female organs are known as archegonia (singular: archegonium) and are protected by the thin surrounding perichaetum (plural: perichaeta).  Each archegonium has a slender hollow tube, the "neck", down which the sperm swim to reach the egg cell.

Liverwort species may be either dioicous or monoicous. In dioicous liverworts, female and male sex organs are borne on different and separate gametophyte plants. In monoicous liverworts, the two kinds of reproductive structures are borne on different branches of the same plant. In either case, the sperm must move from the antheridia where they are produced to the archegonium where the eggs are held.  The sperm of liverworts is biflagellate, i.e. they have two tail-like flagellae that enable them to swim short distances, provided that at least a thin film of water is present. Their journey may be assisted by the splashing of raindrops. In 2008, Japanese researchers discovered that some liverworts are able to fire sperm-containing water up to 15 cm in the air, enabling them to fertilize female plants growing more than a metre from the nearest male.

When sperm reach the archegonia, fertilisation occurs, leading to the production of a diploid sporophyte. After fertilisation, the immature sporophyte within the archegonium develops three distinct regions: (1) a foot, which both anchors the sporophyte in place and receives nutrients from its "mother" plant, (2) a spherical or ellipsoidal capsule, inside which the spores will be produced for dispersing to new locations, and (3) a seta (stalk) which lies between the other two regions and connects them. The sporophyte lacks an apical meristem, an auxin-sensitive point of divergence with other land plants some time in the Late Silurian/Early Devonian. When the sporophyte has developed all three regions, the seta elongates, pushing its way out of the archegonium and rupturing it. While the foot remains anchored within the parent plant, the capsule is forced out by the seta and is extended away from the plant and into the air.  Within the capsule, cells divide to produce both elater cells and spore-producing cells.  The elaters are spring-like, and will push open the wall of the capsule to scatter themselves when the capsule bursts.  The spore-producing cells will undergo meiosis to form haploid spores to disperse, upon which point the life cycle can start again.

Asexual reproduction 

Some liverworts are capable of asexual reproduction; in bryophytes in general "it would almost be true to say that vegetative reproduction is the rule and not the exception." For example, in Riccia, when the older parts of the forked thalli die, the younger tips become separate individuals.

Some thallose liverworts such as Marchantia polymorpha and Lunularia cruciata produce small disc-shaped gemmae in shallow cups. Marchantia gemmae can be dispersed up to 120 cm by rain splashing into the cups. In Metzgeria, gemmae grow at thallus margins. Marchantia polymorpha is a common weed in greenhouses, often covering the entire surface of containers; gemma dispersal is the "primary mechanism by which liverwort spreads throughout a nursery or greenhouse."

Symbiosis 
Thalloid liverworts typically harbor symbiotic glomeromycete fungi which have arbuscular (cilia-bearing) rootlets resembling those in vascular plants. Species in the Aneuraceae, however, associate with basidiomycete fungi belonging to the genus Tulasnella, while leafy liverworts typically harbor symbiotic basidiomycete fungi belonging to the genus Serendipita.

Ecology 

Today, liverworts can be found in many ecosystems across the planet except the sea and excessively dry environments, or those exposed to high levels of direct solar radiation. As with most groups of living plants, they are most common (both in numbers and species) in moist tropical areas. Liverworts are more commonly found in moderate to deep shade, though desert species may tolerate direct sunlight and periods of total desiccation.

Classification

Relationship to other plants 

Traditionally, the liverworts were grouped together with other bryophytes (mosses and hornworts) in the Division Bryophyta, within which the liverworts made up the class Hepaticae (also called Marchantiopsida).  Somewhat more recently, the liverworts were given their own division (Marchantiophyta), as bryophytes became considered to be paraphyletic. However, the most recent phylogenetic evidence indicates that liverworts are indeed likely part of a monophyletic clade ("Bryophyta sensu lato" or "Bryophyta Schimp.") alongside mosses and hornworts. Hence, it has been suggested that the liverworts should be de-ranked to a class called Marchantiopsida. In addition, there is strong phylogenetic evidence to suggest that liverworts and mosses form a monophyletic subclade named Setaphyta.

An important conclusion from these phylogenies is that the ancestral stomata appear to have been lost in the liverwort lineage. Among the earliest fossils believed to be liverworts are compression fossils of Pallaviciniites from the Upper Devonian of New York. These fossils resemble modern species in the Metzgeriales. Another Devonian fossil called Protosalvinia also looks like a liverwort, but its relationship to other plants is still uncertain, so it may not belong to the Marchantiophyta. In 2007, the oldest fossils assignable at that time to the liverworts were announced, Metzgeriothallus sharonae from the Givetian (Middle Devonian) of New York, United States. However, in 2010, five different types of fossilized liverwort spores were found in Argentina, dating to the much earlier Middle Ordovician, around 470 million years ago.

Internal classification 

Bryologists classify liverworts in the division Marchantiophyta. This divisional name is based on the name of the most universally recognized liverwort genus Marchantia. In addition to this taxon-based name, the liverworts are often called Hepaticophyta. This name is derived from their common Latin name as Latin was the language in which botanists published their descriptions of species. This name has led to some confusion, partly because it appears to be a taxon-based name derived from the genus Hepatica which is actually a flowering plant of the buttercup family Ranunculaceae. In addition, the name Hepaticophyta is frequently misspelled in textbooks as Hepatophyta, which only adds to the confusion.

Although there is no consensus among bryologists as to the classification of liverworts above family rank, the Marchantiophyta may be subdivided into three classes:

 The Jungermanniopsida includes the two orders Metzgeriales (simple thalloids) and Jungermanniales (leafy liverworts).
 The Marchantiopsida includes the three orders Marchantiales (complex-thallus liverworts), and Sphaerocarpales (bottle hepatics), as well as the Blasiales (previously placed among the Metzgeriales). It also includes the problematic genus Monoclea, which is sometimes placed in its own order Monocleales.
 A third class, the Haplomitriopsida is newly recognized as the sister group of the other liverworts; it comprises the genera Haplomitrium, Treubia, and Apotreubia.

An updated classification by Söderström et al. 2016
 Marchantiophyta Stotler & Crandall-Stotler 2000
 Haplomitriopsida Stotler & Crandall-Stotler 1977
 Calobryales Hamlin 1972
 Treubiales Schljakov 1972
 Marchantiopsida Cronquist, Takhtajan & Zimmermann 1966
 Blasiidae He-Nygrén et al. 2006
 Blasiales Stotler & Crandall-Stotler 2000
 Marchantiidae Engler 1893 sensu He-Nygrén et al. 2006
 Lunulariales Long 2006
 Marchantiales Limpricht 1877 (complex thalloids)
 Neohodgsoniales Long 2006
 Sphaerocarpales Cavers 1910 (bottle liverworts)
 Jungermanniopsida Stotler & Crandall-Stotler 1977
 Jungermanniidae Engler 1893 (leafy liverworts)
 Jungermanniales von Klinggräff 1858
 Porellales Schljakov 1972
 Ptilidiales Schljakov 1972
 Metzgeriidae Bartholomew-Began 1990
 Metzgeriales Chalaud 1930
 Pleuroziales Schljakov 1972
 Pelliidae He-Nygrén et al. 2006
 Fossombroniales Schljakov 1972
 Pallaviciniales Frey & Stech 2005
 Pelliales He-Nygrén et al. 2006

It is estimated that there are about 9000 species of liverworts, at least 85% of which belong to the leafy group. Despite that fact, no liverwort genomes have been sequenced to date and only few genes identified and characterized.

Economic importance
In ancient times, it was believed that liverworts cured diseases of the liver, hence the name. In Old English, the word liverwort literally means liver plant. This probably stemmed from the superficial appearance of some thalloid liverworts which resemble a liver in outline, and led to the common name of the group as hepatics, from the Latin word hēpaticus for "belonging to the liver". An unrelated flowering plant, Hepatica, is sometimes also referred to as liverwort because it was once also used in treating diseases of the liver. This archaic relationship of plant form to function was based in the "Doctrine of Signatures".

Liverworts have little direct economic importance today. Their greatest impact is indirect, through the reduction of erosion along streambanks, their collection and retention of water in tropical forests, and the formation of soil crusts in deserts and polar regions  However, a few species are used by humans directly. A few species, such as Riccia fluitans, are aquatic thallose liverworts sold for use in aquariums. Their thin, slender branches float on the water's surface and provide habitat for both small invertebrates and the fish that feed on them.

Gallery 

A small collection of images showing liverwort structure and diversity:

See also 
 Bryophyte
 Embryophyte

References

External links 

 
 
 Liverwort structure in pictures
 LiToL: Assembling the Liverwort Tree of Life (note: for 500,000 million years ago read "480 million years ago".)
 Inter-relationships of Mosses, Liverworts, and Hornworts
 Additional information on Liverworts
 Liverworts

 
Plant divisions
Early Ordovician first appearances
Extant Ordovician first appearances